In August 1856 the Committee of Elections and Qualifications conducted a re-count of the 1856 election for the district of Northumberland Boroughs, in which Bourn Russell had been declared elected by a margin of 8 votes over Elias Weekes.

The returning officer was Isaac Gorrick who was a friend of Bourn Russell. The nomination of Russell was moved by Edward Close and seconded by John Kingsmill. Once a poll was called for, Gorrick appointed Close and Kingsmill as deputy returning officers. In January Close had also chaired a meeting at Morpeth where Weekes had addressed the voters.

William Christie lodged a petition with a £100 deposit, against the election alleging that more than 20 people who were unqualified to vote had voted for Russell. This was not a secret ballot and voters were required to write their name and address on the ballot paper. Christie subsequently published a list of the 21 people whose votes had been struck off. Because the committee was able to identify the ballot papers for people who were unable to vote, they recounted the eligible votes and declared that Elias Weekes had been elected.

Dates

Result

The Committee of Elections and Qualifications conducted a re-count of the 1856 Northumberland Boroughs election and declared that Bourn Russell had not been elected the member for Northumberland Boroughs. No by-election was conducted, instead the committee declared that Elias Weekes had been elected.

See also
Electoral results for the district of Northumberland Boroughs
List of New South Wales state by-elections

References

1894 elections in Australia
New South Wales state by-elections
1890s in New South Wales